is a Japanese professional wrestler best known by his stage name . He currently wrestles for Big Japan Pro Wrestling in the Deathmatch division, where he has held the BJW Deathmatch Heavyweight Championship on one occasion.

Personal life
Numazawa got married on July 4, 2014, upon which he adopted his wife's surname, Fukui.

Other media

Numazawa appears as himself alongside Ryuji Ito, Abdullah Kobayashi, Takashi Sasaki and Daisuke Sekimoto in the 2006 movie Dirty Sanchez: The Movie. Numazawa and the other wrestlers perform wrestling moves on the three main cast members.

Championships and accomplishments
Apache Army
WEW World Tag Team Championship (1 time) – with Jun Kasai
Big Japan Pro Wrestling
BJW Deathmatch Heavyweight Championship (1 time)
BJW Tag Team Championship (4 times) – with Abdullah Kobayashi (1) and Jun Kasai (3)
Yokohama Shopping Street 6-Man Tag Team Championship (5 times) – with Abdullah Kobayashi and Kazuki Hashimoto (1), and Daisuke Sekimoto and Ryuji Ito (2), Abdullah Kobayashi and Ryuji Ito (1), Abdullah Kobayashi and Yuko Miyamoto (1) and Ryuji Ito and Yuko Miyamoto (1)
One Night Six Man Tag Tournament (2004) – with Harashima and Super-X
DDT Pro-Wrestling
Ironman Heavymetalweight Championship (1 time)
Shin-Kiba Meibutsu Golden Love Lotion Championship (1 time)
Doutonbori Pro Wrestling
WDW Tag Team Championship (1 time) – with Masashi Takeda

References

1977 births
Living people
Japanese male professional wrestlers
Masked wrestlers
21st-century professional wrestlers
WEW World Tag Team Champions
BJW Deathmatch Heavyweight Champions
BJW Tag Team Champions
Yokohama Shopping Street 6-Man Tag Team Champions